Muniz is a census-designated place (CDP) in Hidalgo County, Texas, United States. The population was 1,370 at the 2010 United States Census. It is part of the McAllen–Edinburg–Mission Metropolitan Statistical Area.

 Muniz, a colonia, has about half of its population born in foreign countries, with, in all probability, almost all from Mexico, and with many of them being illegal immigrants. In 2015 Chris McGreal of The Guardian described Muniz as the poorest U.S. settlement along a United States border.

History
The community received street lights in 2013.

Geography
Muniz is located at  (26.254502, -98.090230).

Sizes and conditions of houses vary; many are made of cement and/or wood.

Demographics
As of the census of 2000, there were 1,106 people, 232 households, and 221 families residing in the CDP. The population density was 1,037.4 people per square mile (399.1/km2). There were 259 housing units at an average density of 242.9/sq mi (93.5/km2). The racial makeup of the CDP was 63.74% White, 0.36% Native American, 35.62% from other races, and 0.27% from two or more races. Hispanic or Latino of any race were 99.01% of the population.

There were 232 households, out of which 75.0% had children under the age of 18 living with them, 74.6% were married couples living together, 16.4% had a female householder with no husband present, and 4.7% were non-families. 3.4% of all households were made up of individuals, and 2.6% had someone living alone who was 65 years of age or older. The average household size was 4.77 and the average family size was 4.78.

In the CDP, the population was spread out, with 48.8% under the age of 18, 11.7% from 18 to 24, 28.0% from 25 to 44, 9.5% from 45 to 64, and 2.0% who were 65 years of age or older. The median age was 19 years. For every 100 females, there were 105.2 males. For every 100 females age 18 and over, there were 97.2 males.

The median income for a household in the CDP was $13,547, and the median income for a family was $13,229. Males had a median income of $12,353 versus $11,413 for females. The per capita income for the CDP was $3,230. About 84.7% of families and 86.1% of the population were below the poverty line, including 97.4% of those under age 18 and 100.0% of those age 65 or over.

In 2010, Muniz had the second-lowest median household income of all places in the United States with a population over 1,000.  Muniz has about half of its population born in foreign countries, with, in all probability, almost all from Mexico, and with many of them being illegal immigrants.

Education 
Muniz is in the Donna Independent School District. Residents are divided between Garza Elementary School and Singleterry Elementary School. All residents are zoned to Sauceda Middle School and Donna North High School.

In addition, South Texas Independent School District operates magnet schools that serve the community.

References

Census-designated places in Hidalgo County, Texas
Census-designated places in Texas